Richard E. Atha (February 6, 2020) was an American basketball player and coach.

Basketball career
He played collegiately for the Indiana State Sycamores and scored 1,119 career points.  He led the team in scoring during the 1951–52 and 1952–53 seasons. He was a 3-time All-Indiana Collegiate Conference guard and was selected as an Helms Athletic Foundation All-American for the 1953 season; leading the Sycamores to a 3rd-place finish in the National NAIA Tournament.  He started every game during his 3-yr varsity career (85 games), as the Sycamores compiled a 57–28 (20–10 ICC) record.  During the 2nd round of the 1952–53 NAIA Tournament, he scored his career high (32 points) vs Arkansas Tech as the Sycamores soundly defeated the Wonder Boys, 100-81.

During his sophomore season, (1950–51), Atha was a member of the US National Men's Basketball team; he averaged 4.3 ppg in helping the U.S. to a 6–0 record and the first gold medal in Pan Am Games history.

He was selected by the New York Knicks in the 1953 NBA draft; however, he served two years in the United States Army before beginning his professional career; he played for the Knicks (1955–56) and Fort Wayne Pistons (now the Detroit Pistons) (1957–58) in the NBA for 43 games before an injury ended his playing career.

Later career
Following his NBA career, Atha was the head basketball coach at Oxford High for ten seasons. When Oxford High consolidated into Benton Central High School in Oxford, Indiana, he became the principal, serving during the 1970s and 1980s. He moved to the athletic director post in the summer of 1986, and retired from that position in 1997.

He was inducted into the Indiana State University Athletics Hall of Fame in 1984 and into the Indiana Basketball Hall of Fame in 1988.

Atha died on February 6, 2020, at age 88.

References

External links 

Indiana Basketball Hall of Fame

1931 births
2020 deaths
American men's basketball players
Basketball coaches from Indiana
Basketball players at the 1951 Pan American Games
Basketball players from Indiana
Indiana State University people
Detroit Pistons players
High school basketball coaches in Indiana
Indiana State Sycamores men's basketball players
New York Knicks draft picks
New York Knicks players
Pan American Games gold medalists for the United States
Pan American Games medalists in basketball
Point guards
Sportspeople from Lafayette, Indiana
Medalists at the 1951 Pan American Games